The name Richmond Parkway may refer to:

In California:
Richmond Parkway (California) in Richmond, California
Richmond Parkway Transit Center, a bus hub in Richmond, California
In New York:
Korean War Veterans Parkway, Staten Island, officially named Richmond Parkway until 1997 and still commonly known by that name